The Pavel Bure Most Exciting Player Award is an annual award presented by the Vancouver Canucks to the player judged to be team's most exciting as voted by the fans. It is one of six annual team awards presented to Canucks players, awarded on the last home game of the regular season. Although the Canucks Media Guide does not recognize any recipients prior to the 1992–93 season, there is record of an annual winner every year since the Canucks' inaugural season in 1970. Prior to the 2013-14 NHL season, the award was simply known as the Most Exciting Player Award. On November 1, 2013, Canucks Sports & Entertainment announced that it would be renamed the Pavel Bure Most Exciting Player Award in honor of the team's first Hockey Hall of Fame inductee and five-time winner of the award, Pavel Bure. The most recent recipient is J.T. Miller, who received the award for the first time in his career in the 2021–22 NHL Season.

The most prolific award winners in Canucks history have been:
Tony Tanti – 5 times (1984–88)
Pavel Bure – 5 (1992–1995, 1998)
Todd Bertuzzi – 4 (2000, 2002–2004)
Bobby Lalonde – 3 (1975–1977)
Alexandre Burrows - 3 (2008–10)

Award winners

See also
Babe Pratt Trophy
Cyclone Taylor Trophy
Cyrus H. McLean Trophy
Fred J. Hume Award
Molson Cup

References

External links
 Official Canucks Award Winner Archive on Canucks.com
 Canucks Award List

Vancouver Canucks trophies and awards